Center Township may refer to the following places in the U.S. state of Kansas:

 Center Township, Atchison County, Kansas
 Center Township, Chautauqua County, Kansas
 Center Township, Clark County, Kansas
 Center Township, Cloud County, Kansas
 Center Township, Decatur County, Kansas
 Center Township, Dickinson County, Kansas
 Center Township, Doniphan County, Kansas
 Center Township, Hodgeman County, Kansas
 Center Township, Jewell County, Kansas
 Center Township, Lyon County, Kansas
 Center Township, Marshall County, Kansas
 Center Township, Mitchell County, Kansas
 Center Township, Nemaha County, Kansas
 Center Township, Ness County, Kansas
 Center Township, Norton County, Kansas
 Center Township, Ottawa County, Kansas
 Center Township, Pottawatomie County, Kansas
 Center Township, Pratt County, Kansas
 Center Township, Rawlins County, Kansas
 Center Township, Reno County, Kansas
 Center Township, Rice County, Kansas
 Center Township, Riley County, Kansas
 Center Township, Rush County, Kansas
 Center Township, Russell County, Kansas
 Center Township, Smith County, Kansas
 Center Township, Stevens County, Kansas
 Center Township, Wilson County, Kansas
 Center Township, Woodson County, Kansas

See also
 List of Kansas townships
 Center Township (disambiguation)

Kansas township disambiguation pages